The AFA was a Spanish automobile manufactured between 1943 and 1944. Little is known about the marque other than that a few (1 or 2) 5cv 4-cylinder cabriolets were built by Joan Aymerich Casanoves in Barcelona. AFA is for Aymerich Fábrica de Automoviles or Aymerich Automobile Factory. The AFA was powered by a four-stroke 527 cc engine that produced 13 hp at 3,500 rpm. The AFA microcar had a manual transmission with four gears with a top speed of 85 km/h. The company exhibited at the Exposición Automovilista Nacional in Madrid on July 10, 1944. In 1935 Joan had created the failed "National Ruby" car, due to the outbreak of the Spanish Civil War he was not able to go to production. But his experience served as the basis for the AFA. The AFA prototype was registered in Barcelona in April 1943, with the registration number B-72.107 and its patent number was 159,882. Joan Aymerich Casanoves hoped to make 100 cars annually, but only produced one or two cars. Aymerich died in 1946, and the car project was then abandoned in 1947. In 2008, a son of Joan Aymerich contacted the mNACTEC Terrassa, which took the only remaining car and restored it. After three years of restoration work, the AFA is now on exhibition at Transport mNACTEC.

Dimensions and weights:
 Length: 3,200 mm
    Width: 1,320 mm
    Height: 1,280 mm
    Weight: 530 kg
    Load: 710 kg
 Maximum speed: 85 km/h
 Consumption: 100 km with 6 L
 Acceleration: 0 to 85 km/h in 50 seconds

See also
Automotive industry in Spain

References

 Companies Based in Barcelona,  LIFE JOURNEY, 2013
George Nick Georgano: The Beaulieu Encyclopedia of the Automobile. Volume 1: A–F. Fitzroy Dearborn Publishers, Chicago 2001, . 
AFA Logo

Defunct motor vehicle manufacturers of Spain
Companies based in Barcelona